The 1991 season was the Hawthorn Football Club's 67th season in the Australian Football League and 90th overall.

Fixture

Premiership season

Finals series

Ladder

References

Hawthorn Football Club seasons